Willows Bank is a village in Belize District, Belize. 

Populated places in Belize District
Belize Rural North